Anveshana is a 1985 Indian Telugu-language mystery thriller film written and directed by Vamsy. It stars Karthik, Bhanupriya, Kaikala Satyanarayana and Sarath Babu with music composed by Ilaiyaraaja. The story revolves around an ornithologist and a police officer coming to a forest and trying to solve the mystery of a series of killings, allegedly by a man-eating tiger.

The film received positive response for its screenplay, performances, and music, and was commercially successful. It ran for 100 days in 11 centres. It was also dubbed into Tamil as Paadum Paravaigal in 1986. Anveshana has attained a cult status over the years.

Plot 
Rao dreams of publishing a book on birds and the origin of music from their sounds. Pandu works as his driver. They stay in a forest house and prepare the thesis for the same. He calls his friend's daughter Hema from a city and appoints her to write the book. James is a forest ranger investigating the case of a man-eating tiger in that area. After Hema comes, Rao's manager Ghokale is brutally killed in the forest, allegedly by a tiger. Rao had to appoint another manager Amar for assisting his work. After he comes, a bullock cart owner Sooranna is also killed in the forest, supposedly by a tiger.

It is revealed that Amar is actually a police officer in disguise who comes to investigate the serial killings in the forest. When Sooranna dies, he follows the tiger's footprints and finds out that they actually belong to a human. He suspects that the murders are well planned by a criminal. He also learned that the victims were actually following Hema as she wandered in the forest. He seeks the help of Hema in solving the case, to which she agrees. How they find the killer forms the rest of the story.

Cast 
 Karthik as Amar
 Bhanupriya as Hema
 Kaikala Satyanarayana as Rao
 Rallapalli as Paandu
 Sarath Babu as James, Range officer
 Subhalekha Sudhakar as Chantigadu, mentally challenged
 Mallikharjunarao as Puliraju, Village president
 Y. Vijaya as Puliraju's wife
 Viswanatham as Sooranna
 Ponni as Sumathi

Production

Development 
This is the third film for Vamsy as a director after Manchu Pallaki (1982) and Sitaara (1984). After Sitaara, producer Kamineni Prasad approached Vamsy and gave him an advance for making the next film with him. He was fine with any story. He just wanted an outline of the story. Vamsy thought of making a suspense film. He was interested in this genre from his childhood. 

He recollected a Kannada film Aparichita (1978) he watched some time back. It was completely shot in a forest. He wanted to make a suspense film with a forest backdrop. He had an outline of the story. He worked with several script writers including Yandamuri Veerendranath, but he was not satisfied with them. Then he tried to write the story as a novel. At the same time, Indira Gandhi was assassinated and there was unrest in the country and all the shootings were cancelled. In this time period, he completed the novel and showed it to the producers, and they liked it.

Filming 
Art director Thota Tarani built a set in Talakona forest near Tirupati. The film unit stayed in a nearby village, Nerabailu. The film was shot with a budget of 15 lakh in a schedule of 60 days. Bhanupriya dubbed in her own voice for the first time in her career in Anveshana.

Music 
Ilaiyaraaja composed the music for this film. Vamsi and Ilaiyaraaja went to Madurai to compose the music for the film. It took more than a week for Ilaiyaraaja to compose the re-recording for this film. The lyrics of all the songs were written by Veturi and were recorded at the Prasad Deluxe Theatre in Madras. The music rights of the film were acquired by Aditya Music.

Reception 
In his review for Zamin Ryot, Griddaluru Gopalrao appreciated Vamsy's screenplay and direction while being critical of the thin storyline. On the technical aspects, Gopalrao called M. V. Raghu's cinematography "marvellous", in addition to praising the score by Ilayaraja, and performances of Karthik, Satyanarayana, Rallapalli, Bhanupriya and Vijaya.

Notes

References

External links 
 

1985 films
1980s Telugu-language films
Films scored by Ilaiyaraaja
Films directed by Vamsy
Indian mystery thriller films
1980s mystery thriller films
Films set in forests